Choqa Balk-e Kuchek (also Romanized as Choqā Balk-e Kūchek) is a village in Mahidasht Rural District, Mahidasht District, Kermanshah County, Kermanshah Province, Iran. At the 2006 census, its population was 70, in 15 families.

References 

Populated places in Kermanshah County